The Centrist Alliance (AC) is a centrist political party in France.

It was founded in June 2009 by Jean Arthuis, a former member of the Union for French Democracy (UDF) and currently Member of European parliament, where he also serves as chair of the Committee on Budgets.

The party is seen as a successor to Arthuis' Rally the Centrists (Rassembler les centristes) political association, whose main tenet was to re-create the UDF which was dissolved upon creation of the MoDem and the New Centre.

Elected officials
Members of the European parliament: Jean Arthuis 
Deputies: Thierry Benoit, Philippe Folliot
Senators: Muguette Dini, Yves Détraigne, Françoise Férat, Adrien Giraud, Joseph Kergueris, Jean-Claude Merceron, Anne-Marie Payet, Daniel Soulage, François Zocchetto.

In addition, Kergueris is President of the General Council of Morbihan. Thierry Benoit is general councillor in Ille-et-Vilaine.

Leadership
 President: Jean Arthuis (2009–2016)Philippe Folliot (2016–present)

Footnotes

External links
  Centrist Alliance official website

Political parties in France
Centrist parties in France
Pro-European political parties in France
Union for French Democracy breakaway groups